Roger Wickson is a Canadian figure skater. He was the 1949 and 1950 national champion.

Results

Canadian male single skaters
20th-century Canadian people